Isaac Gabriel Díaz Arce (born March 6, 1993, in Guadalajara, Jalisco) is a Mexican professional footballer who plays as a forward.

References

External links
 USL Championship profile

1993 births
Living people
Footballers from Jalisco
Association football forwards
Tecos F.C. footballers
Loros UdeC footballers
Mineros de Zacatecas players
Las Vegas Lights FC players
FC Tulsa players
USL Championship players
Mexican expatriate footballers
Expatriate soccer players in the United States
Mexican expatriate sportspeople in the United States
Mexican footballers